Gary Peter Wade (born 2 April 1970) is a South African slalom canoer who competed in the early 1990s. He finished 40th in the K-1 event at the 1992 Summer Olympics in Barcelona.

References

1970 births
Canoeists at the 1992 Summer Olympics
Living people
Olympic canoeists of South Africa
South African male canoeists